Dunalka Parish is one of the administrative territories of South Kurzeme Municipality, in Latvia. On 1 July 2010, the parish had a population of 802. It covers an area of 87.5 km2. It is bordered by the parishes of Tadaiķi, Durbe, Vecpils, Medze, Vērgale, Saka, Cīrava and Aizpute. The center of the parish is Dunalka.

Villages of Dunalka parish 
 Dunalka
 Dunalkas skola
 Dupļi
 Rāva

See also 
 Dunalka Manor
 Dunalka Old Manor

External links 
 Dunalka parish in Latvian

Parishes of Latvia
South Kurzeme Municipality
Courland